K3 en de Kattenprins (K3 and the Cat Prince) is the third movie of the Flemish girlband K3. The movie was released in 2007 and was directed by Matthias Temmermans. This was also their last movie to include former member of K3, Kathleen Aerts. The film was aired on Zappelin, Ketnet, Kindernet and RTL Telekids

Plot

K3 has found a book of fairy tales in their bedroom. In this book hey see a prince who had been cursed by the cat-queen. If the prince is not kissed by his true love by midnight, he will change into a cat. To find his true love, he asks the fairy Fiorella for help. Fiorella goes down to the house of K3 and brings them to Fairyland, high in the clouds.

Cast

 Karen Damen as herself
 Kristel Verbeke as herself
 Kathleen Aerts as herself 
 Roel Vanderstukken as The Prince
 Terence Schreurs as Fiorella
 Irene Moors as Cook/Aunt Yvette
 Carry Goossens as Lackey Nestor/Uncle André
 Frank van Erum as Lackey Fribulaer
 Geert Dehertefelt as Lackey
 Inni Massez as Lady in waiting
 Kim Nelis as Lady in waiting
 Annelies Smeyers as Lady in waiting
 Wali Oliviers as Gardener
 Anne Mie Gils as Abbesinia
 Britt Van Der Borght as Fillina 
 Knarf Van Pellecom as Krats

Soundtrack

 K3 - Prinses(Princess) 
 K3 - Ware liefde(True Love)

Nederlandse DVD Movie Top 30

References

2007 films
2000s Dutch-language films